Hermann Johann Heinrich Behrends (11 May 1907 – 4 December 1948) was a Nazi Party member and SS official with the rank of lieutenant general (Gruppenführer).

Born in Rüstringen, Oldenburg, the son of a provincial innkeeper, he was educated to doctorate level in law at Marburg University but struggled to find employment in an economically depressed Weimar Germany. He joined the Nazi Party in January 1932 and the SS the following month. With no military experience he initially floundered but soon attracted the attentions of Reinhard Heydrich, who valued academic expertise, and he was transferred to the Sicherheitsdienst (SD).

Becoming a close friend of Heydrich, Behrends was the first chief of the SD in Berlin.  He also served as Chief of Staff to Werner Lorenz in his capacity as head of the Hauptamt Volksdeutsche Mittelstelle (VOMI). During the Second World War he was sent to Yugoslavia to lead the regional arm of the VOMI.  His star had fallen somewhat after Heydrich's death as Heinrich Himmler was unimpressed by him, sensing that he was too ambitious.

On 5 July 1945, he faced charges from the British services in Flensburg. He was interned with the number 560294 in the Island Farm Special Camp in Bridgend, South Wales. On 16 April 1946 he was extradited to Yugoslavia. He was hanged in Belgrade on 4 December 1948.

Decorations and awards

1939 Iron Cross 2nd Class 
War Merit Cross 2nd Class

References

Sources

 

1907 births
1948 deaths
People from Wilhelmshaven
People from the Grand Duchy of Oldenburg
Nazi Party politicians
Members of the Reichstag of Nazi Germany
Gestapo personnel
SS and Police Leaders
University of Marburg alumni
Executed people from Lower Saxony
Nazis executed by Yugoslavia by hanging
German prisoners of war in World War II held by the United Kingdom
People extradited from the United Kingdom
People extradited to Yugoslavia
Waffen-SS personnel
SS-Brigadeführer